The 2012–13 UEFA Futsal Cup was the 27th edition of Europe's premier club futsal tournament and the 12th edition under the current UEFA Futsal Cup format.

Teams

th Title Holder

Preliminary round
The draw for the preliminary round and the main round took place on 4 July 2012 in the UEFA headquarters in Nyon, Switzerland. First, the 27 lowest ranked teams were divided into 7 groups of 4 (one of 3) and later the tournament hosts were selected, which are indicated in italics. The preliminary round will run from 8 to 12 August, with only the group winners advancing to the next round.

Group A

Group B

Group C

Group D

Group E

Group F

Group G

Main round
Following the preliminary round draw, the seventeen teams allocated in the main round pot and the seven group winners were distributed into six groups of four. Matches are set to take place between 4 September and 8 October, hosted by a selected club in each group, which is highlighted with italics. The top two teams in each group will join the four highest-ranked clubs, that are already in the elite round after received bye for the early stage of the tournament.

Group 1

Group 2

Group 3

Group 4

Group 5

Group 6

Elite round

Group A

Group B

Group C

Group D

Final four
The following teams have qualified for the Final Four round:
 FC Barcelona Futsal
 AFC Kairat
 MFK Dinamo Moskva
 Iberia Star (host)

Final

References

External links
 Official UEFA Futsal Cup website

UEFA Futsal Champions League
Cup